The 1951 Volta a Catalunya was the 31st edition of the Volta a Catalunya cycle race and was held from 13 September to 23 September 1951. The race started in Sant Esteve Sesrovires and finished in Barcelona. The race was won by Primo Volpi.

General classification

References

1951
Volta
1951 in Spanish road cycling
September 1951 sports events in Europe